Labdia halticopa is a moth in the family Cosmopterigidae. It was described by Edward Meyrick in 1927. It is known from Samoa.

References

Labdia
Moths described in 1927